FGC may refer to:
 Family Groove Company, an American band
 Family Group Conference
 Federal Government College (disambiguation)
 Female genital cutting
 Ferozepur Group of Colleges, in Punjab, India
 , a Spanish railway company
 Fifth generation computer
 Fighting game community
 Florida Gateway College, in Lake City, Florida, United States
 Friends General Conference, a North American Quaker association 
 Friends of Garrity Creek, in California, United States
 , a communist youth organization